Isan is a subdistrict municipality (thesaban tambon) in Thailand, about 409 km north-east of Bangkok. The town covers the whole tambon Isan of Mueang Buriram district. The town is the main economic center of Buriram Province.

See also

 Buriram
 Buriram Province
 Amphoe Mueang Buriram

References

External links
Official Website

Populated places in Buriram province